The 1993–94 Croatian Football Cup was the third edition of Croatia's football knockout competition. Hajduk Split were the defending champions, and the cup was won by Croatia Zagreb.

Calendar

First round

|}

Second round

|}

Quarter-finals

|}

Semi-finals

First legs

Second legs

3–3 on aggregate, Rijeka won on away goals rule.

Croatia Zagreb won 4–1 on aggregate.

Final

First leg

Second leg

Croatia Zagreb won 2–1 on aggregate.

See also
1993–94 Croatian First Football League
1993–94 Croatian Second Football League

External links
Official website 
1994 Croatian Football Cup at Rec.Sport.Soccer Statistics Foundation
1994 Croatian Cup Final at Rec.Sport.Soccer Statistics Foundation

Croatian Football Cup seasons
Croatian Cup, 1993-94
Croatian Cup, 1993-94